The 1824 Massachusetts gubernatorial election was held on April 5.

Republican Governor William Eustis was re-elected to a second term in office over U.S. Representative Samuel Lathrop, a Federalist ally of John Quincy Adams. This was the last election in which the dying Federalist Party, which had already collapsed at the national level, was competitive.

General election

Candidates
Samuel Lathrop, U.S. Representative from West Springfield (Adams Federalist)
William Eustis, incumbent Governor since 1823 and former U.S. Secretary of War (Republican)

Results

Notes

References

Governor
1824
Massachusetts
November 1824 events